Kordovan-e Olya (also Romanized as Kordovān-e ‘Olyā; also known as Kardovan, Kerdevān-e Bālā, Kerdevān Khāneh, Kordavān, Kordavān-e Bālā, Kordovān, Kordovān-e Bālā, Kordovān-e Mīānī, Kordovān-e Vosţá, Kurdavan, and Kurdavān Khāneh) is a village in Kabgan Rural District, Kaki District, Dashti County, Bushehr Province, Iran. At the 2006 census, its population was 679, in 159 families.

Geography
Kordovan-e Olya is at the 70 km from Dashti and at the North of the Mound River. Meyteh, Ziarat Saheli, Esmail Mahmudi, Kordavan Sofla, and Kordavan Raisi are nearby villages.

Population
Most of the people are farmer and women are making artifact. Kordovan-e Olya has been the land of the scientists who were very famous in Dashti County.

Language and dialect
The dialect of the village is the traditional dialect from Dashti.

The Dashti dialect is an original Iranian Dialect and it is back to Pahlavi Sassanid language and now people are using the words that were used in Pahlavi language, after some centuries.

Notable residents
Zaer Mohammad Ali Dashti or Faez Dashti was a poet born in Kordovan-e Olya in 1834, and lived there his whole life. Abd-ol-Reza Kordavani or Mahzun was another poet in Kordovan.

References 

Populated places in Dashti County